Haiti competed at the 1996 Summer Olympics in Atlanta, United States. The Haitian team consisted of seven competitors: three track and field athletes, two judoka, one swimmer and one tennis player.

Athletics

Men
Track & road events

Judo 

Men

Swimming 

Men

Tennis

See also
Haiti at the 1995 Pan American Games

References
The Official Report of the Centennial Olympic Games, Volume III - The Competition Results (pdf)

Nations at the 1996 Summer Olympics
1996 Summer Olympics
Summer Olympics